AFC Dunstable are a football club based in Dunstable, Bedfordshire, England. The club are members of Division One Central of the Southern League, and are affiliated to the Bedfordshire County Football Association. They play at Creasey Park.

History
The club was established in 1981 as Old Dunstablians, named after a club for former pupils of Dunstable Grammar School. The new club played at Manshead School, which had succeeded the grammar school. They initially played in the Dunstable Alliance Football League, before joining the Luton District and South Befordshire League in 1983. In 1989–90 the club won the Bedfordshire Junior Cup.

In 1994 the club moved to Totternhoe, when Dunstable Town Cricket Club opened a new sports facility in the village. The new ground allowed the club to join Division One of the South Midlands League in 1995. In 1997 the league merged with the Spartan League to form the Spartan South Midlands League, with the club placed in Division One North. In 2001–02 they won the Division One Cup, and in 2003–04 were champions of the renamed Division Two. However, failure to achieve the ground grading regulations meant that the club was unable to take promotion.

In 2004 the club changed their name to AFC Dunstable, although reference to the former name was retained in the club's nickname of the OD's. After winning Division Two again in 2006–07, a season in which they also won the Division Two Cup and the Bedfordshire Senior Trophy the club were again refused promotion. They won the Senior Trophy for a second time in 2007–08, and after finishing third in Division Two 2008–09 and moving to Creasey Park, they were promoted to Division One. In 2010–11 AFC Dunstable finished as runners-up in Division One and won the Division One Cup, earning promotion to the Premier Division. In 2015–16 they won the Premier Division and were promoted to Division One Central of the Southern League. In 2016–17 the club won the Bedfordshire Senior Cup, defeating Dunstable Town 2–0 in the final, going on to defeat Luton Town by the same scoreline in the Bedfordshire Premier Cup.

The 2017–18 season saw Dunstable finish fifth in the renamed East Division, qualifying for the promotion play-offs. However, they were beaten 2–0 in the semi-finals by Hartley Wintney.

League history

Honours
Spartan South Midlands League
Premier Division champions 2015–16
Division Two champions 2003–04, 2006–07
Division One Cup winners 2001–02, 2010–11
Division Two Cup winners, 2006–07
Bedfordshire Senior Cup
Winners 2016–17
Bedfordshire Premier Cup
Winners 2016–17
Bedfordshire Senior Trophy
Winners 2006–07, 2007–08
Bedfordshire Junior Cup
Winners 1989–90

Records
Best FA Cup performance: Third qualifying round 2020–21
Best FA Trophy performance: Second qualifying round, 2022–23
Best FA Vase performance: Fourth round 2015–16
Most appearances: BJ Christie (2008–present)
Most goals: BJ Christie (2008–present)

References

External links
Official website

Dunstable
South Midlands League
Spartan South Midlands Football League
Southern Football League clubs
Association football clubs established in 1981
Football clubs in Bedfordshire
1981 establishments in England
Football clubs in England